Lemyra inaequalis is a moth of the family Erebidae first described by Arthur Gardiner Butler in 1879. It is found in Japan and Korea.

Subspecies
Lemyra inaequalis inaequalis (Japan, south to Yaku)
Lemyra inaequalis sakaguchii (Matsumura, 1930) (Okinawa)

References

Moths described in 1879
inaequalis
Moths of Japan